The Bez (also: Bès) is a tributary to the river Drôme in the Drôme department of France. It has a drainage basin of 278 km².

Geography
The drainage basin of the Bez lies in the east of the department of Drôme. To the north and east the basin is defined  by the Vercors Plateau (elevation between 1500 and 2000 meters) and to the south by the slightly lower heights of the Diois Plateau. The bassin drains to the west, the valley of the Drôme. The Bez joins the right bank of Drôme, in the town of Saint-Roman, about ten km upstream from the town of Die through with it eventually becomes a tributary to the river Rhône.

References

Rivers of France
Rivers of Drôme
Rivers of Auvergne-Rhône-Alpes